António de Magalhães Pires de Lima, usually known as António Pires de Lima (Lisbon, April 7, 1962), is a Portuguese economist, business administrator and politician. He served as Minister of Economy of Portugal between 2013 and 2015 in the Pedro Passos Coelho cabinet. He was CEO of Sumol + Compal and Unicer. He is a founding partner of Horizon Equity Partners, a Portuguese investment management and private equity firm. In 2021, Pires de Lima left the CDS-PP party after decades of prominent membership which included positions as party vice president under the leadership of Paulo Portas, member of parliament (MP) and head of the Portuguese Ministry of Economy. He currently is the CEO of Brisa - Autoestradas de Portugal.

See also
XIX Constitutional Government of Portugal

References

Government ministers of Portugal
Portuguese politicians
Portuguese business executives
Catholic University of Portugal alumni
1962 births

Living people